Honeymoon in Vegas is a 1992 American romantic comedy film written and directed by Andrew Bergman and starring James Caan, Nicolas Cage and Sarah Jessica Parker.

Plot 
Private Detective ("Private eye") Jack Singer (Nicolas Cage) swore to his mother on her deathbed that he would never marry. His girlfriend, Betsy (Sarah Jessica Parker) wants to get married and start a family, and he proposes a quick Las Vegas marriage. They check into the Bally's Casino Resort.

Before the wedding, however, a wealthy professional gambler, Tommy Korman (James Caan), notices Betsy has a striking resemblance to his beloved late wife, Donna. He arranges a crooked poker game (with Jerry Tarkanian as one of the other players) that prompts Jack to borrow $65,000 after being dealt a straight flush (7-8-9-10-Jack of clubs), only to lose to the gambler's higher straight flush (8-9-10-Jack-Queen of hearts); Tommy offers to erase the debt in exchange for spending the weekend with Betsy.

After Tommy agrees to no sex, the desperate couple consent. Jack discovers that Tommy has taken Betsy to his vacation home in Kauai. The gambler asks his taxi driver friend, Mahi Mahi (Pat Morita) to keep Jack as far as possible from him and Betsy. Jack discovers this and steals the taxi. He sees Betsy outside the Kauai Club where he is attacked by Tommy and arrested. Jack's dentist friend, Sally Molars (John Capodice), bails Jack out of jail. Mahi Mahi meets Jack outside and admits that Tommy left for Las Vegas with Betsy and has convinced her to marry him. Mahi races Jack to the airport. Betsy decides she cannot go through with the wedding and escapes from Tommy.

Meanwhile, after changing many planes and finding himself stuck in San Jose, Jack tries frantically to find a flight to Las Vegas. He joins a group about to depart for Las Vegas but discovers mid-flight that they are the Utah chapter of the "Flying Elvises" – a skydiving team of Elvis impersonators. Jack realizes he has to skydive from 3,000 feet to get to Betsy. Jack overcomes his fear. He lands and spots Betsy, ruining Tommy's plans.

Jack and Betsy are married in a small Las Vegas chapel with the Flying Elvises as guests. Jack is wearing a white illuminated jumpsuit and Betsy in a stolen showgirl outfit.

Cast 
James Caan as Tommy Korman
Nicolas Cage as Jack Singer
Sarah Jessica Parker as Betsy Nolan Singer/Donna Korman
Peter Boyle as Chief Orman
Seymour Cassel as Tony Cataracts
Pat Morita as Mahi Mahi
Johnny Williams as Johnny Sandwich
John Capodice as Sally Molars
Robert Costanzo as Sidney Tomashefsky
Anne Bancroft as Bea Singer
Tony Shalhoub as Buddy Walker
Burton Gilliam as Roy Bacon
Clearance Giddens as Black Elvis
Ben Stein as Walter
Brent Hinkley as Vern
Bruno Mars (credited as Bruno Hernandez) as Little Elvis

Production and release 
Director and writer Andrew Bergman said about the film, "It wasn't based on anything. I wanted to do a boy-girl story, and in my perverse fashion, it turned out to be this." The film's budget was $25 million.

Filming began in August 1991, and was underway in Las Vegas as of September. Bally's Casino Resort was among the filming locations in Las Vegas. Las Vegas' Chapel of the Bells wedding chapel was also used for filming. Other filming locations included New York, and Culver Studios in California.

Filming in Kauai was concluded as of November 1991. Among the filming locations in Kauai was the Inn on the Cliffs restaurant, located at the Westin Kauai Hotel. Filming also took place at Kauai's National Tropical Botanical Garden. A house on Anini Beach was used as Tommy Korman's Hawaiian residence. The film was initially rated R for language, and was edited to instead receive a PG-13 rating.

A premiere event was held for the film at Mann's Chinese Theatre in Hollywood on August 25, 1992. The film was released theatrically on August 28, 1992.

Reception

Box office 
The film earned $35,208,854 during its theatrical run.

Critical response 
The film earned generally positive reviews from critics, On review aggregator Rotten Tomatoes, the film holds an approval rating of 66% based on 35 reviews, with an average rating of 6.1/10. The site's critical consensus reads, "Honeymoon in Vegas is a light screwball comedy that has just about what you expect (and nothing you don't)."

Awards and nominations 
50th Golden Globe Awards
Nominated: Best Picture – Musical or Comedy
Nominated: Best Actor in a Motion Picture – Musical or Comedy: Nicolas Cage

Soundtrack 
The soundtrack was composed mainly of covers of Elvis Presley songs performed by country and pop/rock artists. Also included are the ramblings of Chief Orman when Mahi Mahi takes Jack to his Chief's shack instead of Korman's beach side mansion. The score is by David Newman.

Track listing (movie) 
"Viva Las Vegas" – Bruce Springsteen
"Hound Dog" – (score) – Jeff Beck and Jed Leiber
"Are You Lonesome Tonight?" – Bryan Ferry
"Heartbreak Hotel" – Billy Joel
"Jailhouse Rock" – John Mellencamp
"Suspicious Minds" – Dwight Yoakam
"Burning Love" – Travis Tritt
"That's All Right" – Vince Gill
"Love Me Tender" – Amy Grant
"All Shook Up" – Billy Joel
"Blue Hawaii" – Willie Nelson
"(You're the) Devil in Disguise" – Trisha Yearwood
"Wear My Ring Around Your Neck" – Ricky Van Shelton
"Surrender" – Elvis Presley
"Jailhouse Rock" – Elvis Presley
"That's All Right" – Elvis Presley
"Can't Help Falling in Love" – Bono
"It's Now or Never" – Elvis Presley
"Can't Help Falling in Love" – (score)
 "La Donna è Mobile" – Franco Bonisolli
"Hawaii Kua Uli" – (score)
"Happy Talk" – Peter Boyle
"Hilo March" – (score)
"(Let Me) Be Your Teddy Bear – (score)
"Ka Lae O Makahonu" – (score)
"Waikiki Beach" – (score)
"Bali Hai" – Peter Boyle

Track listing (available on CD) 
"All Shook Up" – Billy Joel
"Wear My Ring Around Your Neck" – Ricky Van Shelton
"Love Me Tender" – Amy Grant
"Burning Love" – Travis Tritt
"Heartbreak Hotel" – Billy Joel
"Are You Lonesome Tonight?" – Bryan Ferry
"Suspicious Minds" – Dwight Yoakam
"(You're The) Devil in Disguise" – Trisha Yearwood
"Hound Dog" – Jeff Beck and Jed Leiber
"That's All Right" – Vince Gill
"Jailhouse Rock" – John Mellencamp
"Blue Hawaii" – Willie Nelson
"Can't Help Falling in Love" – Bono

Chart performance

Certifications

Stage version 

Bergman says when he finished the film he thought it might make a good musical. He was distracted making movies but then had open heart surgery in 2001. "When you have open-heart surgery, you say, what do I really want to do? What haven't I done? I thought it'd be great to do a musical."

Jason Robert Brown, a composer, had always wanted to do Honeymoon as a musical and wrote some songs on spec. He and Bergman agreed to collaborate. "We certainly were looking to do a real book musical that isn't really done much anymore," said Bergman. We wanted the sound to be of the '60s and '70s—not that it's a throwback, but we wanted that sound. We wanted to be a brassy, come and love us kind of show."

A big change from the movie was the character of the mother was kept alive. "Having her recur is a great thing for the show," said Bergman. "It keeps her spirit alive and it keeps his mishigas alive. That was a real change."

A musical stage version of the movie was written by Jason Robert Brown (music and lyrics) and Andrew Bergman (book). A Broadway-bound production was expected to debut in Toronto in November 2012, starring Tony Danza as Tommy Korman. However, the Toronto premiere was canceled, and production was transferred to the Paper Mill Playhouse in New Jersey instead with Danza remaining. The Paper Mill production opened on September 26, 2013, and ran through October 27. The musical began previews on Broadway at the Nederlander Theatre on November 18, 2014, and opened officially on January 15, 2015. Direction is by Gary Griffin with choreography by Denis Jones. The cast features Tony Danza, Rob McClure and Brynn O'Malley, who were also in the Paper Mill production.

See also
 List of films set in Las Vegas

References

External links 

 
 
 
 
 The Flying Elvi

1992 films
1990s English-language films
1992 romantic comedy films
American romantic comedy films
Castle Rock Entertainment films
Columbia Pictures films
Country music films
Films about weddings
Films directed by Andrew Bergman
Films set in the Las Vegas Valley
Films set in Hawaii
Films shot in the Las Vegas Valley
Films shot in Hawaii
Films about gambling
New Line Cinema films
Cultural depictions of Elvis Presley
Films scored by David Newman
Films with screenplays by Andrew Bergman
1990s American films